Xihong Lin is a Chinese-American statistician known for her contributions to mixed models, nonparametric and semiparametric regression, and statistical genetics and genomics. , she is the Henry Pickering Walcott Professor and Chair of the Department of Biostatistics  at Harvard T.H. Chan School of Public Health and Coordinating Director of the Program in Quantitative Genomics.

Lin received the COPSS Presidents' Award in 2006, the Spiegelman award of the outstanding health statistician from the American Public Health Association in 2002, and the MERIT Award from the National Cancer Institute (2007-2016).

Lin was elected a fellow of the American Statistical Association in 2000 and of the Institute of Mathematical Statistics in 2007, and an elected member of the International Statistical Institute in 2006. She won the Florence Nightingale David Award of the Committee of Presidents of Statistical Societies in 2017 "for leadership and collaborative research in statistical genetics and bioinformatics; and for passion and dedication in mentoring students and young statisticians". Lin was elected to the National Academy of Medicine in 2018.

Lin received her B.Sc. from Tsinghua University in 1989 and her Ph.D. in biostatistics from the University of Washington in 1994, where her supervisor was Norman Breslow. Her dissertation was Bias Correction in Generalized Linear Mixed Models.

References

External links
Xihong Lin's home page

Living people
20th-century births
American statisticians
Women statisticians
Fellows of the Institute of Mathematical Statistics
Fellows of the American Statistical Association
Harvard University faculty
People's Republic of China emigrants to the United States
Tsinghua University alumni
University of Washington alumni
Elected Members of the International Statistical Institute
Year of birth missing (living people)
Members of the National Academy of Medicine
American people of Chinese descent
Chinese women mathematicians
American women mathematicians
Chinese statisticians
Biostatisticians
21st-century American women